Faruk Namdar (born 6 May 1974 in West Berlin, West Germany) is a former professional Turkish footballer.

Namdar made 104 appearances in the Turkish Süper Lig and 12 appearances in the German 2. Bundesliga during his playing career.

References

External links 
 
 Faruk Namdar at the Turkish Football Federation 

1974 births
Living people
Footballers from Berlin
Turkish footballers
Süper Lig players
2. Bundesliga players
Association football midfielders
Association football forwards
Füchse Berlin Reinickendorf players
Tennis Borussia Berlin players
Hannover 96 players
Altay S.K. footballers
MKE Ankaragücü footballers
Karşıyaka S.K. footballers
Mardinspor footballers
SV Yeşilyurt players
Turkish expatriate footballers
Expatriate footballers in Germany